Perth—Middlesex was an electoral district in Ontario, Canada, that was represented in the House of Commons of Canada from 1997 to 2003 and in the Legislative Assembly of Ontario from 1999 to 2007.

This riding was created in 1996 from parts of Lambton—Middlesex, London—Middlesex and Perth—Wellington—Waterloo ridings. It consisted of:

 the County of Perth (including the City of Stratford and the Town of St Mary's) and
 the northeast part of the County of Middlesex (consisting of the Townships of McGillivray, East Williams, Lobo, Biddulph and West Nissouri).

The electoral district was abolished in 2003 when it was redistributed between Elgin—Middlesex—London, Middlesex—Kent—Lambton and Perth—Wellington ridings.

Members of Parliament

This riding has elected the following Members of Parliament:

Federal election results

Provincial election results

See also 

 List of Canadian federal electoral districts
 Past Canadian electoral districts

External links 

 Website of the Parliament of Canada
 Elections Ontario  1999 results and 2003 results

Former federal electoral districts of Ontario